East Tampa is an unincorporated community in Hillsborough County, Florida, United States. It is partially within the census-designated place (CDP) of Gibsonton. The ZIP code for East Tampa is 33619.

Geography
East Tampa is located at 27.9 degrees north, 82.4 degrees west (27.8649, 82.38028); or about 11.8 miles southeast of Tampa. The elevation for the community is 11 feet above sea level.

East Tampa boundaries include the Alafia River and Gibsonton to the south, Interstate 75 to the east, and U.S. Highway 41 to the west. Riverview Drive runs through the center of the community from east to west.

Major roads in East Tampa
Some of the major roads serving the community include:
Riverview Drive
U.S. Highway 41
Interstate 75

Education
The community of East Tampa is served by Hillsborough County Schools.

References

External links
East Tampa profile from Hometown Locator

Unincorporated communities in Hillsborough County, Florida
Unincorporated communities in Florida